Margaret of Brunswick-Lüneburg (1442 – 8 April 1512 in Wienhausen) was a princess of Brunswick-Lüneburg by birth and by marriage a Duchess of Mecklenburg-Stargard.

Life 
Margaret was a daughter of the Duke Frederick II of Brunswick-Lüneburg (1418–1478) from his marriage to Magdalene (1412–1454), the daughter of Elector Frederick I of Brandenburg.

In 1452, Margaret became the third wife of the Duke Henry of Mecklenburg-Stargard (1412–1466).  As a dowry she brought with her , which her husband doubled.  After her husband's death, she lived on her jointure in Plau am See, which Henry had promised to her.

With the death of her stepson Ulrich II the Mecklenburg-Stargard line died out and the indebted country fell to Mecklenburg-Schwerin, which was not responsible for the maintenance of Stargard's widow.  Margaret then lived  in Celle for a while.  The dispute between the houses of Brunswick-Lüneburg and Mecklenburg-Schwerin about her jointure at Plau am See dragged on until her death.

Margaret spent her 46-year-long widowhood in abject poverty.  In letters to their relatives, they said that they would suffer even hunger and thirst.  In 1499 she was, under pressure from the Dukes of Brunswick, admitted as a permanent resident to Wienhausen Abbey.  She was financially supported by her sister-in-law Anne, the widow of her brother Otto V, who sent her only 12 guilders per year.

She died on 8 April 1512 in Wienhausen and was buried there in the Chapel of All Saints.

Issue 
From her marriage Margaret had two daughters:
 Magdalene (1461–1532)
 married firstly, in 1475, with Duke Wartislaw X of Pomerania (1435–1478)
 married secondly, in 1482, with Count Burkhard of Barby-Mühlingen (d. 1505)
 Anna (1465–1498), a nun in Ribnitz Monastery

Ancestors

References 
 Verein für Mecklenburgische Geschichte und Alterthumskunde, Schwerin: Mecklenburgische Jahrbücher, vols. 24–25, 1859, p. 33 ff.
 Martina Schattkowsky: Witwenschaft in der frühen Neuzeit: fürstliche und adlige Witwen zwischen Fremd- und Selbstbestimmung, Leipziger Universitätsverlag, 2003, p. 106

External links 
 http://www.guide2womenleaders.com/womeninpower/Womeninpower1450.htm
 http://www.emecklenburg.de/Niklot/i0392.htm

1442 births
1512 deaths
Margaret
Duchesses of Mecklenburg-Stargard
15th-century German people
15th-century German women
Margaret
Daughters of monarchs